Mental Health Week is an awareness week in Australia. It was first held in 1985 and is now an annual event. It is held in October, including 10 October, which is World Mental Health Day.

The Australian Broadcasting Corporation holds "Mental As", when it broadcasts various stories related to mental health issues during Mental Health Week.

See also
 Mental Health Awareness Month, in the United States

References

Health observances
Awareness weeks
October observances
Health education in Australia
Mental health in Australia